Wordplay is a 2006 documentary film directed by Patrick Creadon.  It features Will Shortz, the editor of the New York Times crossword puzzle, crossword constructor Merl Reagle, and many other noted crossword solvers and constructors. The second half of the movie is set at the 2005 American Crossword Puzzle Tournament (ACPT), where the top solvers compete for a prize of $4000. Wordplay was the best reviewed documentary film of 2006, according to Rotten Tomatoes.

The movie focuses on the following crossword solvers:
 Ellen Ripstein: editor living in New York City and 2001 ACPT champion. She is also known for her baton twirling.
 Trip Payne: professional puzzlemaker living in South Florida and three-time ACPT champion. He held the record as the youngest champion after winning the tournament in 1993 at the age of 24.
 Tyler Hinman: student at Rensselaer Polytechnic Institute in Troy, New York. At the 2005 ACPT, he challenged Trip Payne for the title of youngest champion ever.
 Jon Delfin: pianist living in New York City and seven-time ACPT champion.
 Al Sanders: project manager at Hewlett-Packard in Fort Collins, Colorado. He is a frequent finalist at the ACPT.

The film contains appearances by many celebrity fans of the Times puzzle, including Bill Clinton, Bob Dole, Jon Stewart, Ken Burns, Mike Mussina, Daniel Okrent, and the Indigo Girls.

A 2008 episode of The Simpsons, "Homer and Lisa Exchange Cross Words", is based on the film.  James L. Brooks got the inspiration for the episode after watching Wordplay. "We felt both Will and Merl were very compelling, off-the-beaten-track personalities [in Wordplay], who would fit into our universe very well", Brooks said.  The episode was written by Tim Long, and directed by Nancy Kruse, and guest-starred crossword puzzle creators Reagle and Shortz as themselves.

Wordplay features a theme song, "Every Word", written and performed by Gary Louris of The Jayhawks. The Wordplay DVD features a music video of "Every Word".

References

External links 
WORDPLAY site for Independent Lens on PBS
 
 
 
 An Interview with Patrick Creadon, the Director of Wordplay
 

2006 films
American documentary films
Documentary films about words and language
Crosswords
Documentary films about competitions
Documentary films about Connecticut
Films set in Connecticut
Films about The New York Times
Films directed by Patrick Creadon
IFC Films films
2000s English-language films
2000s American films